Tess Annique is an American model. Annique has modeled for magazines such as Maxim and Cosmopolitan. She is currently married to Canadian ice hockey player Sheldon Souray.

Education and career
Annique was born in Corona del Mar to German immigrant parents. She grew up in southern California. German was her first language.

Annique graduated with a degree in fashion media from Southern Methodist University in University Park, Texas, and also studied nutrition at Cornell University in Ithaca, New York. She also earned a certification from the Institute of Integrative Nutrition.

Annique has modeled for magazines such as Maxim. She has also worked with Cosmopolitan and walked for Miami Swim Week and LAFW. Other than modeling, she also works as a health coach.

Personal life

In August 2020, Tess Annique announced her engagement to Canadian ice hockey player Sheldon Souray, whom she had initially met in January 2017. The couple married on September 12, 2021, at Lake Coeur D'Alene in Idaho. Annique and her husband currently reside in Las Vegas.

References

External links
Instagram

Living people
People from Newport Beach, California
American female models
Southern Methodist University alumni
Year of birth missing (living people)